Love Diaries is a 2010 album by Hong Kong musician Janice Vidal.

Track listing 
 你的女人 "Your Woman"
 愛在天地動搖時 "In Love When the World Shook"
 2012 
 積雪 "Snow Accumulation"
 溫差 "Temperature Difference"
 唯愛人間 "Nothing But Love in the World"
 男人信什麼 "What Do Men Believe" (Duet with JW) 
 Make It Real 
 為你鍾情 "Deep In Love With You" (Duet with 李治廷) 
 Never Know (Duet with 李治廷) 
 越夜越有機 "More Chances in Deeper Night"
 戀人も濡れる街

DVD 
衛蘭MOOV Live 2010 
 心亂如麻 
 Make It Real 
 唯愛人間 
 陰天假期 
 Never Know (Duet with 李治廷) 
 為你鍾情 (Duet with 李治廷) 
 My Cookie Can 
 Please 
 情人 
 Beautiful 
Bonus MV 
 男人信什麼 (MV) 
 唯愛人間 (MV)

External links 
 A music
 [ All-Music Guide]

2010 albums
Janice Vidal albums